Henri Guaino (born 11 March 1957) is a French speechwriter and politician who served as the member of the National Assembly for the 3rd constituency of Yvelines from 2012 to 2017. A member of The Republicans (LR), he previously was a special advisor to President Nicolas Sarkozy from 2007 until his retirement from politics following the 2012 election.

Career

Presidency of Nicolas Sarkozy 
Guaino was responsible for writing the Dakar address which Sarkozy delivered in 2007 and was criticised for being patronising towards the African continent.

National Assembly 
In the 2012 legislative election, he was elected to the National Assembly for the Yvelines department.

On 3 September 2012, he unexpectedly announced his intention to run for the presidency of the Union for a Popular Movement (UMP). Guaino stated that his aim was to represent the Gaullist component of the UMP's heritage in this internal election, Gaullism, a way forward for France, a movement within the party he co-founded. However, he failed to receive enough endorsements and subsequently announced his endorsement of Jean-François Copé.

In 2017, he announced that he would run for reelection to the National Assembly, but in the 2nd constituency of Paris. His party, The Republicans (formerly the UMP), however nominated former Ecology Minister Nathalie Kosciusko-Morizet to that seat. He ran under the miscellaneous right banner and lost in the first round with just 4.5% of the vote, finishing seventh. Gilles Le Gendre defeated Kosciusko-Morizet in the second round.

In popular culture 
In the movie La Conquête (The Conquest), staging Nicolas Sarkozy's life from his appointment at the Ministry of the Interior in 2002 to his election in 2007, Guaino is played by Michel Bompoil.

References

1957 births
Living people
People from Arles
The Republicans (France) politicians
Gaullism, a way forward for France
French political writers
Speechwriters
French male non-fiction writers
Paris-Sorbonne University alumni
Sciences Po alumni
Deputies of the 14th National Assembly of the French Fifth Republic
French people of Italian descent